The 2018 My Bariatric Solutions 300 was the 6th stock car race of the 2018 NASCAR Xfinity Series season, and the 22nd iteration of the event. The race was held on Saturday, April 7, 2018 in Fort Worth, Texas, at Texas Motor Speedway, a 1.5 miles (2.4 km) permanent tri-oval shaped racetrack. The race took the scheduled 200 laps to complete. At race's end, Ryan Blaney of Team Penske would dominate and win his 7th and so far final career NASCAR Xfinity Series win, and his first and only of his part-time season. To fill out the podium, Christopher Bell of Joe Gibbs Racing and Daniel Hemric of Richard Childress Racing would finish second and third, respectively.

Background 

Texas Motor Speedway is a speedway located in the northernmost portion of the U.S. city of Fort Worth, Texas – the portion located in Denton County, Texas. The track measures 1.5 miles (2.4 km) around and is banked 24 degrees in the turns, and is of the oval design, where the front straightaway juts outward slightly. The track layout is similar to Atlanta Motor Speedway and Charlotte Motor Speedway (formerly Lowe's Motor Speedway). The track is owned by Speedway Motorsports, Inc., the same company that owns Atlanta and Charlotte Motor Speedway, as well as the short-track Bristol Motor Speedway.

Entry list

Practice

First practice 
The first practice was held on Friday, April 6 at 1:05 PM CST.

Second and final practice 
The second and final practice was held on Friday, April 6 at 3:05 PM CST.

Qualifying 
Qualifying would take place on Saturday, April 7, at 11:10 AM CST. Since Texas Motor Speedway is under 2 miles (3.2 km), the qualifying system was a multi-car system that included three rounds. The first round was 15 minutes, where every driver would be able to set a lap within the 15 minutes. Then, the second round would consist of the fastest 24 cars in Round 1, and drivers would have 10 minutes to set a lap. Round 3 consisted of the fastest 12 drivers from Round 2, and the drivers would have 5 minutes to set a time. Whoever was fastest in Round 3 would win the pole.

However, qualifying would be rained out midway through the first round. NASCAR would decide to cancel qualifying and decide that every driver who ran a time before the red flag would have their times retained. Then, the drivers who didn't run a time would qualify based on owner's points.

Two drivers would fail to qualify: Mike Harmon and Matt Mills.

Full qualifying results

Race results 
Stage 1 Laps: 45

Stage 2 Laps: 45

Stage 3 Laps: 110

References 

2018 NASCAR Xfinity Series
NASCAR races at Texas Motor Speedway
April 2018 sports events in the United States
2018 in sports in Texas